Survivor: Palawan is the eighth season of the Israeli reality program Survivor. The season featured 17 contestants competing against each other for the 1 million NIS prize and the title of "Sole Survivor". It aired from May 20, 2017 until September 16, 2017, when Inbar Pinievsky Basson was named the winner over Ma'ayan Adam and Masgano Mangisto during the live finale; Adam won the fan favorite award after winning a public vote.

This season featured the return of the Island of the Dead from seasons one, four and six (as Hope Island), in which voted out contestants were exiled to a secluded beach where they competed against other voted out contestants for a chance to return to the game. This season also retained the Negotiation Cabin from seasons six and seven, in which one representative from each tribe met to negotiate deals, such as allocating supplies or picking castaways to switch tribes.

Contestants

Season summary

Survivor Auction

Voting history

Notes

References

External links
  

Survivor (Israeli TV series)
Channel 2 (Israeli TV channel) original programming
2017 Israeli television seasons
Reality television articles with incorrect naming style
Television shows filmed in the Philippines